A superhabitable planet is a hypothetical type of exoplanet or exomoon that may be better suited than Earth for the emergence and evolution of life. The concept was introduced in 2014 by René Heller and John Armstrong, who have criticized the language used in the search for habitable planets and proposed clarifications. According to Heller and Armstrong, knowing whether or not a planet is in its host star's habitable zone (HZ) is insufficient to determine its habitability: It is not clear why Earth should offer the most suitable physicochemical parameters to living organisms, as "planets could be non-Earth-like, yet offer more suitable conditions for the emergence and evolution of life than Earth did or does." While still assuming that life requires water, they hypothesize that Earth may not represent the optimal planetary habitability conditions for maximum biodiversity; in other words, they define a superhabitable world as a terrestrial planet or moon that could support more diverse flora and fauna than there are on Earth, as it would empirically show that its environment is more hospitable to life.

Heller and Armstrong also point out that not all rocky planets in a habitable zone (HZ) may be habitable, and that tidal heating can render terrestrial or icy worlds habitable beyond the stellar HZ, such as in Europa's internal ocean.  The authors propose that in order to identify a habitable—or superhabitable—planet, a characterization concept is required that is biocentric rather than geo- or anthropocentric. Heller and Armstrong proposed to establish a profile for exoplanets according to stellar type, mass and location in their planetary system, among other features. According to these authors, such superhabitable worlds would likely be larger, warmer, and older than Earth, and orbiting K-type main-sequence stars.

General characteristics 
Heller and Armstrong proposed that a series of basic characteristics are required to classify an exoplanet or exomoon as superhabitable;
 for size, it is required to be about 2 Earth masses, and 1.3 Earth radii will provide an optimal size for plate tectonics. In addition, it would have a greater gravitational attraction that would increase retention of gases during the planet's formation. A denser atmosphere may also influence the surface relief, making it more regular and decreasing the size of the ocean basins, which would improve diversity of marine life in shallow waters.

Other factors to consider are the type of star in the system. K-type stars and low-luminosity G-type stars, collectively referred to as orange dwarfs, are less massive than the Sun, and are stable on the main sequence for a very long time (18 to 34 billion years, compared to 10 billion for the Sun, a G2V star), giving more time for the emergence of life and evolution. In addition, orange dwarfs emit less ultraviolet radiation (which can damage DNA and thus hamper the emergence of nucleic acid based life) than stars like the Sun.  Additional information on orange dwarfs, including quantitative estimates about their suitability to serve as hosts for superhabitable planets, has been given by Cuntz and Guinan.

Surface, size and composition 

An exoplanet with a larger volume than that of Earth, or with a more complex terrain, or with a larger surface covered with liquid water, could be more hospitable for life than Earth. Since the volume of a planet tends to be directly related to its mass, the more massive it is, the greater its gravitational pull, which can result in a denser atmosphere.

Some studies indicate that there is a natural radius limit, set at R🜨, below which nearly all planets are terrestrial, composed primarily of rock-iron-water mixtures. It was once thought that objects with a mass below 8 M🜨 are very likely to be of similar composition as Earth; above this limit, the density of the planets decreases with increasing size, the planet will become a "water world" and finally a gas giant. In addition, for most super-Earths with masses 7 times Earth's, their high masses may cause them to lack plate tectonics.  Thus, it is expected that any exoplanet similar to Earth's density and with a radius under 2 R🜨 may be suitable for life. However, other studies indicate that water worlds represent a transitional stage between mini-Neptunes and the terrestrial planets, especially if they belong to red dwarfs or K dwarfs. Although water planets may be habitable, the average depth of the water and the absence of land area would not make them superhabitable as defined by Heller and Armstrong. Further studies on the mass-radius relationship also indicate that the transition point between a rocky planet and a mini-Neptune usually occurs much earlier, at only about 2 M🜨; exceptions to this are very close to their stars (and thus would have had their volatile atmospheres boiled away), producing very hot surface conditions not very conducive for life. From a geological perspective, the optimal mass of a planet is about 2 M🜨, so it must have a radius that keeps the density of the Earth among 1.2 and 1.3R🜨.

The average depth of the oceans also affects the habitability of a planet. The shallow areas of the sea, given the amount of light and heat they receive, usually are more comfortable for known aquatic species, so it is likely that exoplanets with a lower average depth are more suitable for life. More massive exoplanets would tend to have a regular surface gravity, which can mean shallower—and more hospitable—ocean basins.

Geology 
Plate tectonics, in combination with the presence of large bodies of water on a planet, is able to maintain high levels of carbon dioxide in its atmosphere. This process appears to be common in geologically active terrestrial planets with a significant rotation speed. The more massive a planetary body, the longer time it will generate internal heat, which is a major contributing factor to plate tectonics. However, excessive mass can also slow plate tectonics because of increased pressure and viscosity of the mantle, which hinders the sliding of the lithosphere. Research suggests that plate tectonics peaks in activity in bodies with a mass between 1 and 5M🜨, with an optimum mass of approximately 2M🜨.

If the geological activity is not strong enough to generate a sufficient amount of greenhouse gases to increase global temperatures above the freezing point of water, the planet could experience a permanent ice age, unless the process is offset by an intense internal heat source such as tidal heating or stellar irradiation.

Magnetosphere
Another feature favorable to life is a planet's potential to develop a strong magnetosphere to protect its surface and atmosphere from cosmic radiation and stellar winds, especially around red dwarf stars. Less massive bodies and those with a slow rotation, or those that are tidally locked, have a weak to non-existent magnetic field, which over time can result in the loss of a significant portion of its atmosphere, especially hydrogen, by hydrodynamic escape.

Temperature and climate 
The optimum temperature for Earth-like life in general is unknown, although it appears that on Earth organism diversity has been greater in warmer periods. It is therefore possible that exoplanets with slightly higher average temperatures than that of Earth are more suitable for life. The thermoregulatory effect of large oceans on exoplanets located in a habitable zone may maintain a moderate temperature range. In this case, deserts would be more limited in area and would likely support habitat-rich coastal environments.

However, studies suggest that Earth already lies near to the inner edge of the habitable zone of the Solar System, and that may harm its long-term livability as the luminosities of main-sequence stars steadily increase over time, pushing the habitable zone outwards. Therefore, superhabitable exoplanets must be warmer than Earth, yet orbit further out than Earth does and closer to the center of the system's habitable zone. This would be possible with a thicker atmosphere or with a higher concentration of greenhouse gases.

Star 

The star's type largely determines the conditions present in a system. The most massive star types (O, B, and A) have a very short life cycle, quickly leaving the main sequence. In addition, O-type stars produce a photoevaporation effect that prevents the accretion of planets around the star.

On the opposite side, the less massive M-and late-type K-types are by far the most common and long-lived stars of the universe, but their potential for supporting life is still under study. Their low luminosity reduces the size of the habitable zone, which are exposed to ultraviolet radiation outbreaks that occur frequently, especially during their first billion years of existence. When a planet's orbit is too short, it can cause tidal locking of the planet, where it always presents the same hemisphere to the star, known as day hemisphere. Even if the existence of life were possible in a system of this type, it is unlikely that any exoplanet belonging to a red dwarf star would be considered "superhabitable".

Dismissing both ends, systems with K-type stars (except late-type K stars) and low-luminosity G-type stars, collectively referred to as orange dwarfs, offer the best habitable zones for life. K-type stars allow the formation of planets around them, have long life expectancy, and provide stable habitable zones free of the effects of excessive proximity to their stars. Furthermore, the radiation produced by a K-type star is low enough to allow complex life without the need for an atmospheric ozone layer. They are also the most stable and their habitable zones do not move very much during their lifetimes, so a terrestrial analog located near a K-type star may be habitable for almost all of the main sequence.

Orbit and rotation 

Experts have not reached a consensus about what the optimal rotation speed for an exoplanet is, but it cannot be too fast or slow. The latter case can cause problems similar to those observed in Venus, which completes one rotation every 243 Earth days, and as a result, cannot generate an Earth-like magnetic field. A more massive, slow-rotation planet could overcome this problem by having multiple moons due to its higher gravity that can boost the magnetic field.

Ideally, the orbit of a superhabitable world would be at the midpoint of the habitable zone of its star system.

Atmosphere 
There are no solid arguments to explain if Earth's atmosphere has the optimal composition to host life. On Earth, during the period when coal was first formed, atmospheric oxygen levels were up to 35%, and coincided with the periods of greatest biodiversity. So, assuming that the presence of a significant amount of oxygen in the atmosphere is essential for exoplanets to develop complex life forms, the percentage of oxygen relative to the total atmosphere appears to limit the maximum size of the planet for optimum superhabitability and ample biodiversity.

Also, the atmospheric density should be higher in more massive planets, which reinforces the hypothesis that super-Earths can provide superhabitable conditions.

Age 

In a biological context, planets older than Earth may have greater biodiversity, since native species have had more time to evolve, adapt, and stabilize the environmental conditions to sustain a suitable environment for life that can benefit their descendants.

However, for many years it was thought that since older star systems have lower metallicity, they should display low planet formation, and thus such old planets may have been scant in the beginning, but the number of metallic items in the universe must have grown steadily since its inception. The first exoplanetary discoveries, mostly gas giants orbiting very close to their stars, known as hot Jupiters, suggest that planets were rare in systems with low metallicity, which invited suspicion of a time limit on the appearance of the first objects landmass. Later, in 2012, the Kepler telescope's observations allowed experts to find out that this relationship is much more restrictive in systems with hot Jupiters, and that terrestrial planets could form in stars of much lower metallicity, to some extent. It is now thought that the first Earth-mass objects should appear sometime between 7 and 12 billion years. Given the greater stability of the orange dwarfs (K-type) compared to the Sun (G-type) and longer life expectancies, it is possible that superhabitable exoplanets belonging to K-type stars, orbiting within their habitable zones, could provide longer, steadier, and better environments for life than Earth.

Profile summary 

Despite the scarcity of information available, the hypotheses presented above on superhabitable planets can be summarized as a preliminary profile, even if there is no scientific consensus. 
 Mass: approximately 2M🜨.
 Radius: to maintain a similar density to Earth, its radius should be close to 1.2 or 1.3R🜨.
 Oceans: percentage of surface area covered by oceans should be Earth-like but more distributed, without large continuous land masses. The oceans should be shallow; the light then will penetrate easier through the water and will reach the fauna and flora, stimulating an abundance of life down in the ocean.
 Distance: shorter distance from the center of the habitable zone of the system than Earth.
 Star and age: belonging to an intermediate K-type star with an older age than the Sun (4.5 billion years) but younger than 7 billion years.
 Atmosphere: somewhat denser than Earth's and with a higher concentration of oxygen. That will make life larger and more abundant.

There is no confirmed exoplanet that meets all these requirements.

Appearance 

The appearance of a superhabitable planet should be, in general, very similar to Earth. The main differences, in compliance with the profile seen previously, would be derived from its mass. Its denser atmosphere may prevent the formation of ice sheets as a result of lower thermal difference between different regions of the planet. A superhabitable world would also have a higher concentration of clouds, and abundant rainfall.

The vegetation of such a planet would be very different due to the increased air density, precipitation, temperature, and stellar flux compared to Earth. As the peak wavelength of light differs for K-type stars compared to the Sun, plants may be a different colour than the green vegetation present on Earth. Plant life would also cover more of the surface of the planet, which would be visible from space.

In general, the climate of a superhabitable planet would be warm, moist, homogeneous and have stable land, allowing life to extend across the surface without presenting large population differences in contrast to Earth, which has inhospitable areas such as glaciers, deserts and some tropical regions. If the atmosphere contains enough oxygen, the conditions of these planets may be bearable to humans even without the protection of a space suit, provided that the atmosphere does not contain excessive toxic gases, but they would need to develop adaptations to the increased gravity, such as an increase in muscle and bone density.

Abundance 

Heller and Armstrong speculate that the number of superhabitable planets around Kepler 442-like stars can far exceed that of Earth analogs: less massive stars in the main sequence are more abundant than the larger and brighter stars, so there are more orange (K) dwarfs than solar analogues. It is estimated that about 9% of stars in the Milky Way are K-type stars.

Another point favoring the predominance of superhabitable planets in regard to Earth analogs is that, unlike the latter, most of the requirements of a superhabitable world can occur spontaneously and jointly simply by having a higher mass. A planetary body close to 2 or 3M🜨 should have longer-lasting plate tectonics and also will have a larger surface area in comparison to Earth. Similarly, it is likely that its oceans are shallower by the effect of gravity on the planet's crust, its gravitational field more intense and its atmosphere denser.

By contrast, Earth-mass planets may have a wider range of conditions. For example, some may sustain active tectonics for shorter time periods and will therefore end up with lower air densities than Earth, increasing the probability of developing global ice coverage, or even permanent Snowball Earth scenarios. Another negative effect of lower atmospheric density can be manifested in the form of thermal oscillations, which can lead to high variability in the global climate and increase the chance for catastrophic events. In addition, by having weaker magnetospheres, such planets may lose their atmospheric hydrogen by hydrodynamic escape easier and become desert planets. Any of these examples could prevent the emergence of life on a planet's surface.  In any case, the multitude of scenarios that can turn an Earth-mass planet located in the habitable zone of a solar analogue into an inhospitable place are less likely on a planet that meets the basic features of a superhabitable world, so that the latter should be more common.

In September 2020, astronomers identified 24 superhabitable planet contenders from among more than 4000 confirmed exoplanets at present, based on astrophysical parameters, as well as the natural history of known life forms on the Earth. However, only 3 have been confirmed, and are in the list below.

Confirmed superhabitable planets discovered so far 
Researchers have identified 23 planets that may be "superhabitable." Kepler-69c (KOI 172.02) was initially included before follow up research showed that is likely to be closer to a super-Venus, and thus not superhabitable. Currently, 1 in the list has been confirmed. 

 Kepler-1126b (KOI 2162.01)

Unconfirmed potential superhabitable planets 
The 22 additional unconfirmed planetary candidates include:

 KOI-4878.01
 KOI 5237.01
 KOI 7711.01
 KOI 5248.01
 KOI 5176.01
 KOI 7235.01
 KOI 7223.01
 KOI 7621.01
 KOI 5135.01
 KOI 5819.01
 KOI 5554.01
 KOI 7894.01
 KOI-456.04
 KOI 5715.01: the most promising candidate as a superhabitable planet.
 KOI 5276.01
 KOI 8000.01
 KOI 8242.01
 KOI 5389.01
 KOI 5130.01
 KOI 5978.01
 KOI 8047.01

Further reading 
Newly confirmed, false probabilities for Kepler objects of interest.

In Search for a Planet Better than Earth: Top Contenders for a Superhabitable World

See also 

 List of potentially habitable exoplanets
 Earth analog
 Habitable exoplanet
 Habitable exomoon

Notes

References

Bibliography

External links 

 Catalog of potentially habitable exoplanets

Hypothetical planet types
Astrobiology